East Richmond may refer to:
East Richmond, California
Mira Vista (Richmond View), Richmond, California
East Richmond railway station, Melbourne
East Richmond railway station, Sydney